Pinguicula caerulea, commonly referred to as blue butterwort, blueflower butterwort, or violet butterwort, is a flowering plant species in the carnivorous butterwort (Pinguicula) genus and bladderwort family (Lentibulariaceae). It is a perennial dicot. It grows in moist sandy pineland habitat in the south-east USA. Caerulus is Latin for from the sky or sea and refers to the color of the flowers.

References

caerulea
Endemic flora of the United States
Carnivorous plants of North America
Flora without expected TNC conservation status